Dinopium is a genus of birds in the woodpecker family Picidae. The species are found in South and Southeast Asia.

The genus was introduced by the French polymath Constantine Samuel Rafinesque in 1814 to accommodate the common flameback (Dinopium javanense). The name combines the Classical Greek  meaning "mighty" or "huge" and ōps/ōpos meaning "appearance".

A large phylogenetic study of the woodpecker family Picidae published in 2017 found that the genus was paraphyletic. The olive-backed woodpecker (Dinopium rafflesii) is more closely related to the pale-headed woodpecker (Gecinulus grantia) than it is to other members of the genus Dinopium.

Species
As presently constituted, the genus contains the following 5 species:

References

 
Bird genera
Taxa named by Constantine Samuel Rafinesque